The 2009 Outback Bowl was a college football bowl game played on January 1, 2009, at Raymond James Stadium in Tampa, Florida. The 23rd edition of the Outback Bowl, it was one of the 2008–09 bowl games concluding the 2008 NCAA Division I FBS football season.  Scheduled for a kickoff of 11 a.m. EST and telecast on ESPN, the game pitted the South Carolina Gamecocks against the Iowa Hawkeyes.

Iowa jumped out to a large lead, leading South Carolina 21–0 at halftime and 31–0 at the end of the third quarter, en route to a 31–10 victory. Shonn Greene, the MVP, had 29 rushes for 121 yards and three rushing touchdowns.

Teams
The game featured the Iowa Hawkeyes of the Big Ten Conference and the South Carolina Gamecocks of the Southeastern Conference. It was the first meeting between the two teams. It was each team's third appearance in the Outback Bowl.

Iowa Hawkeyes

The Hawkeyes entered the game with wins in five of their previous six games, highlighted by an upset of #3 Penn State, and an overall record of 8–4 (5–3 Big Ten). Junior running back Shonn Greene earned consensus First-team All-American honors and received the Doak Walker Award.

South Carolina Gamecocks

The Gamecocks dropped their final two regular season games and entered the Outback Bowl with an overall record of 7–5 (4–4 SEC).

Game summary

Scoring summary

Statistics

References 

ReliaQuest Bowl
Outback Bowl
Outback Bowl
21st century in Tampa, Florida
Iowa Hawkeyes football bowl games
South Carolina Gamecocks football bowl games
Outback Bowl